Félix Gouin (4 October 1884 – 25 October 1977) was a French Socialist politician who was a member of the French Section of the Workers' International (SFIO).

Personal life
Félix Gouin was born in Peypin, Bouches-du-Rhône, the son of school teachers. He studied law in Aix-en-Provence.

In 1940 he was among the minority of parliamentarians refusing to grant full powers to Marshal Philippe Pétain.

During the war, he was part of the central committee which reconstituted the Human Rights League and also co-founded the Brutus Network, a Socialist Resistance group.

In 1946, he then succeeded Charles de Gaulle as head of the French Provisional Government. Gouin's tenure was arguably most notable for seeing the enactment of France's first ever compulsory, amply funded retirement and worker's compensation laws. In addition, both the 40-hour law and overtime pay were re-established, while the comites d'entreprise (works councils) were extended to firms with 50 workers. In April 1946, a statute was adopted by the French Parliament that abolished the colonial legal status of France's four oldest colonies: Reunion, Guyane, Martinique, and Guadeloupe. Gouin's time in office also witnessed a significant extension of the role of the state in the workings of the French economy, with electricity, gas, coal, and the nine main insurance groups nationalized.

Honours and awards
 Grand Croix of the Légion d'honneur
 Grand Decoration of Honour in Silver with Sash for Services to the Republic of Austria

Government (26 January – 24 June 1946)
Félix Gouin – Chairman of the Provisional Government
Francisque Gay – Vice Chairman of the Provisional Government
Maurice Thorez – Vice Chairman of the Provisional Government
Georges Bidault – Minister of Foreign Affairs
Edmond Michelet – Minister of Armies
André Le Troquer – Minister of the Interior
André Philip – Minister of Finance and National Economy
Marcel Paul – Minister of Industrial Production
Ambroise Croizat – Minister of Labour and Social Security
Pierre-Henri Teitgen – Minister of Justice
Marcel Edmond Naegelen – Minister of National Education
Laurent Casanova – Minister of Veterans and War Victims
François Tanguy-Prigent – Minister of Agriculture
Henri Longchambon – Minister of Supply
Marius Moutet – Minister of Overseas France
Jules Moch – Minister of Public Works and Transport
Robert Prigent – Minister of Public Health and Population
François Billoux – Minister of Reconstruction and Town Planning
Jean Letourneau – Minister of Posts

References

External links
 

1884 births
1977 deaths
20th-century heads of state of France
20th-century Princes of Andorra
People from Bouches-du-Rhône
Politicians from Provence-Alpes-Côte d'Azur
French Section of the Workers' International politicians
Heads of state of France
Government ministers of France
Members of the 13th Chamber of Deputies of the French Third Republic
Members of the 14th Chamber of Deputies of the French Third Republic
Members of the 15th Chamber of Deputies of the French Third Republic
Members of the 16th Chamber of Deputies of the French Third Republic
Members of the Constituent Assembly of France (1945)
Members of the Constituent Assembly of France (1946)
Presidents of the National Assembly (France)
Deputies of the 1st National Assembly of the French Fourth Republic
Deputies of the 2nd National Assembly of the French Fourth Republic
Deputies of the 3rd National Assembly of the French Fourth Republic
French military personnel of World War I
Grand Croix of the Légion d'honneur
Recipients of the Grand Decoration with Sash for Services to the Republic of Austria